HR 1099 is a triple star system in the equatorial constellation of Taurus, positioned  to the north of the star 10 Tauri. This system has the variable star designation V711 Tauri, while HR 1099 is the star's identifier from the Bright Star Catalogue. It ranges in brightness from a combined apparent visual magnitude of 5.71 down to 5.94, which is bright enough to be dimly visible to the naked eye. The distance to this system is 96.6 light years based on parallax measurements, but it is drifting closer with a radial velocity of about −15 km/s.

R. E. Wilson in 1953 determined that the brighter member of this pair, component A, has a variable radial velocity. In 1963, O. C. Wilson noted that the same component shows very high emission cores in the calcium H and K absorption lines. Follow-up observations by O. C. Wilson in 1964 showed that the hydrogen–α line of component A is fully in emission and it displays moderate broadening due to rotation. He found a stellar classification of K3 V for component B, matching an ordinary K-type main-sequence star.

Observations during 1974–1975 demonstrated that component A is a spectroscopic binary star system of the RS Canum Venaticorum variable class. Given its average magnitude of around 5.9, it is one of the brighter known variables of this type. No eclipses were observed, but an orbital period of 2.838 days was determined. Most of the emission was found to be coming from the more massive member of this pair. Radio emission from the binary was detected by F. N. Owen in 1976. It was shown to be a soft X-ray source in 1978 using the HEAO 1 satellite.

This double-lined spectroscopic binary system consists of an evolving K-type subgiant and an ordinary G-type main sequence star. The two stars are orbiting so close to each other that their tidal effects are giving them an elliptical shape. The subgiant is filling about 80% of its Roche lobe. The chromosphere of the subgiant is one of the most active known, with a deep convective zone powering the magnetic dynamo. The G-type companion has a shallow convection zone and is less active.

In 1980, significant variations were found in some spectral features related to surface temperature, suggesting the presence of starspots. Doppler imaging confirmed these starspots are associated with the K subgiant. (It was the first cool star to have its surface Doppler imaged.) The evidence suggests that the spots first appear at low latitude then migrated toward the poles. These spots are much larger than they are on the Sun. About 70% of all spots have been observed at latitudes higher than 50°, particularly around the polar region. A polar spot has persisted for at least twenty years.

The baseline apparent magnitudes of the two stars, after subtracting the effects of starspots, is 5.80 and 7.20. Long term monitoring indicates the subgiant has two activity cycles, similar to the 11-year solar cycle. A  cycle is associated with symmetrical flip-flopping of the spotted area between hemispheres. The longer 15–16 year cycle is a periodic variation in the total spot area. The global magnetic field of the star may be precessing with respect to the axis of rotation.

See also
 UX Arietis

References

Further reading

G-type main-sequence stars
K-type main-sequence stars
K-type subgiants
RS Canum Venaticorum variables
Triple star systems

Taurus (constellation)
1099
BD+00 0616
022468
016852
Objects with variable star designations